Jerome Maher is an Irish sportsperson. He plays hurling with his local club Geraldines and has been a member of the Waterford senior inter-county team since 2009, making his Championship debut against Tipperary in the Munster Final on 10 July 2011, starting at full back in a 7-19 to 0-19 defeat.

References

Living people
Year of birth missing (living people)
Geraldines (Waterford) hurlers
Waterford inter-county hurlers